Safety is a live action short film directed by Fabrice Joubert and produced by Easter Moon Films & Composite Films, based on the short story Safety written by Lydia Fitzpatrick, about a school shooting in America. Engaged against gun violence the film has been presented and won awards in a number of festivals including at L.A. Film Awards, Lift-Off Los Angeles, Peak City Film Festival and Miami Short Film Festival.

Plot 

In a small-town elementary school, 8-year-old Michael lies on the cold gym floor, stretching with the rest of his class. Suddenly the class hears the sound of a gunshot nearby. As they rush to seek refuge in their gym teacher’s office, Michael senses something familiar about the shooter and makes a daring move, altering both of their lives forever.

Awards

References

External links 
 
 
 

2019 short films
2019 films
Films about school violence
Films about murderers
Films about mass murder
Films about children
Films about brothers